Lloyd Burns (born 9 December 1984, Panteg) is a former Wales international rugby union player. Burns played in the hooker position and played his club rugby for Newport Gwent Dragons having made his debut in the 2008–09 season. He previously played for Pontypool RFC and Cross Keys RFC. Burns also represented Wales at under 16 level.

In May 2011 Burns was selected for Wales' 26-man squad to play the Barbarians on 4 June. He made his full international debut for Wales on 4 June 2011 as a second-half replacement for Huw Bennett. At the time Burns was dual registered with Newport Gwent Dragons regional team and Cross Keys, making him the first Cross Keys player to be capped since Rex 'Tarzan' Richards in 1956.

In August 2011 he was named in the Wales squad for the 2011 Rugby World Cup in New Zealand.

In April 2012 he was forced into retirement from all forms of rugby due to a neck injury and a damaged aorta.

References

External links
Newport Gwent Dragons profile
Wales profile

1984 births
Living people
Cross Keys RFC players
Dragons RFC players
Pontypool RFC players
Pontypool United RFC players
Rugby union players from Panteg
Wales international rugby union players
Welsh rugby union players
Rugby union hookers